The 1992 2. divisjon, the third highest association football league for men in Norway.

22 games were played in 6 groups, with 3 points given for wins and 1 for draws. Ski, Skeid, Åssiden, Åsane, Nardo and Mjølner were promoted to the First Division. Number ten, eleven and twelve were relegated to the 3. divisjon. The winning teams from each of the 19 groups in the 3. divisjon were promoted to the 2. divisjon.

League tables

Group 1

Group 2

Group 3

Group 4

Group 5

Group 6

References

Norwegian Second Division seasons
3
Norway
Norway